Coelocrossa is a genus of moths in the family Geometridae.

Species
 Coelocrossa drepanucha Turner, 1919
 Coelocrossa hypocrocea Turner, 1919

References
 Coelocrossa at Markku Savela's Lepidoptera and Some Other Life Forms
 Natural History Museum Lepidoptera genus database

Ennominae